Hyalurga chthonophyle is a moth of the family Erebidae. It was described by Herbert Druce in 1885. It is found in Mexico.

References

 

Hyalurga
Moths described in 1885